Hans Thomalla (born 1975) is a German composer, who has resided in the United States since 2002.

Career

Hans Thomalla was born in Bonn, and studied composition at the Frankfurt University of Music and Performing Arts, Germany, from 1994 to 1999. From 1999 until 2002 he was assistant dramaturg at the Staatsoper Stuttgart (production dramaturg for Helmut Lachenmann Das Mädchen mit den Schwefelhölzern et al.). This was followed by graduate studies at Stanford University (California) with Brian Ferneyhough from 2002 until 2007. Since 2007 he is Associate Professor of Composition at Northwestern University in Chicago, where he also directs the Institute for New Music.

Thomalla's compositions are featured at international festivals and institutions including Donaueschingen Festival, Huddersfield Contemporary Music Festival, Eclat-Festival Stuttgart, Wittener Tage für neue Kammermusik, Festival d'Automne at Paris, Darmstadt International Summer Courses for New Music. Ensembles performing his works include ensemble recherche, Trio Accanto, Ensemble Ascolta, Ensemble musikFabrik, Arditti Quartet, Spektral Quartet, Ensemble Modern and the Munich Philharmonic. His opera Fremd was premiered at the main stage of the Stuttgart Opera in July 2011.

Awards

 2004: Kranichsteiner Musikpreis
 2006: Christoph Delz Preis
 2006–2007: Fellow at the Stanford Humanities Center
 2009: CIRA Grant (Collaborative Initiatives for Research in the Arts) at Northwestern University
 2011: Composers' Prize of the Ernst von Siemens Musikstiftung
 2013: Faculty Research Grant at Northwestern University
 2014–2015: Fellow at the Wissenschaftskolleg zu Berlin
 2017: Guggenheim Fellowship

Selected works

Solo instrument

 Cello Counterpart for violoncello solo (2006)
 Piano Counterpart for piano (2008)
 Percussion Counterpart. Rhapsody for four reverberating sound-objects (2009)
 Ballade.Rauschen for piano (2014)

Chamber music

 wild.thing for amplified piano and two percussionist (2002–2003)
 Momentsmusicaux for five instruments (2003–2004)
 noema for two prepared pianos (2004)
 Stücke Charakter for six instruments (2005)
 Lied for tenor saxophone, vibraphone and piano (2007–2008)
 Albumblatt for string quartet (2010)
 Albumblatt II for saxophone quartet (2011)
 Wonderblock for ensemble (trumpet, trombone, electric guitar, piano, 2 percussionists, violoncello) (2012–2013)
 Fracking for saxophone and string trio (2013)
 Bagatellen for string quartet (2015)

Ensemble / orchestra

 Ausruff for chamber orchestra or large ensemble (2007)
 The Brightest Form of Absence. Multimedia Composition (Video: William Lamson) for soprano, ensemble, live-electronics, and video (2011)
 Flüchtig. Intermezzo for string orchestra (and guitar and percussion) (2011)
 Ballade for piano and orchestra (2016)

Vocal music

 I come near you for choir and ensemble (2016)

Opera

 Fremd. Opera in three scenes, one intermezzo, and one epilogue for soprano, choir, orchestra, and live-electronics (2005–2011)
 Kaspar Hauser. Opera in three acts for countertenor (Kaspar Hauser), 8 singers, orchestra, and sound director (2013–2015)

Discography

 Fremd. Opera in three scenes, one intermezzo, and one epilogue by Hans Thomalla, Recording: Staatsoper Stuttgart. col legno 2012 (WWE 2SACD 40403)
 Hans Thomalla: Momentmusiceaux / wild.thing / Cello Counterpart / Stücke Charakter, WERGO 2008 (WER 6571 2)
 The Brightest Form of Absence. Multimedia Composition for soprano, ensemble, live-electronics, and video, Donaueschinger Musiktage 2011, NEOS 2012 (NEOS 11214-16)
 Ausruff for chamber orchestra, Donaueschinger Musiktage 2007, Vol. 2, NEOS 2008 (NEOS 10825)
 Lied, "Songs and Poems", Trio Accanto, WERGO (forthcoming)

Bibliography

 Kunkel, Michael. 2009. "Ist 'Widerstand' heute eine musikalische Kategorie? Einige Standpunkte", Dissonanz 105, pp.4–11
 Thomalla, Hans. 2006. "Aspekte Analytischen Komponierens", Komponieren in der Gegenwart. Texte der 42. Internationalen Ferienkurse für Neue Musik 2004, edited by Jörn Peter Hiekel, Saarbrücken: Pfau, pp.96–112
 Thomalla, Hans. 2008. "Counterparts", Facets of the Second Modernity, edited by Claus-Steffen Mahnkopf, Frank Cox, Wolfram Schurig, Hofheim: Wolke, pp.229–241
 Thomalla, Hans. 2010. "'An den Rand des Augenblicks.' Komponieren als Schaffung von Gegenwart", Vorzeitbelebung. Vergangenheits- und Gegenwarts-Reflexionen in der Musik heute, edited by Jörn Peter Hiekel, Hofheim: Wolke, pp.71–82
 Thomalla, Hans. 2011. "Bedeutungsspuren – Widersprüche im zeitgenössischen Musiktheater", Die Kunst der Dramaturgie. Ein Handbuch, edited by Anke Roeder and Klaus Zehelein, Leipzig: Henschel, pp.58–70

References

External links
 
 
 Publisher's website: Hans Thomalla at Edition Juliane Klein
 "A Horizon from Hendrix to Chopin – Hans Thomalla" by Björn Gottstein, Ernst von Siemens Musikstiftung website
 Hans Thomalla Kaspar Hauser – the production of a contemporary opera, a chronicle of the genesis of Hans Thomalla's opera Kaspar Hauser, premiered April 2016 at Theater Freiburg

1975 births
Living people
Musicians from Bonn
German opera composers
Male opera composers
21st-century classical composers
German male classical composers
Stanford University alumni
Northwestern University faculty
Frankfurt University of Music and Performing Arts alumni
Ernst von Siemens Composers' Prize winners
21st-century German composers
21st-century German male musicians